The Chief of Defence of Denmark, acting under the statutory responsibility of the Minister of Defence, is the chief of defence and commander of the Royal Danish Army, the Royal Danish Navy and the Royal Danish Air Force. The Chief of Defence is the principal military adviser to the Minister of Defence and the head of the Defence Command.

The Chief of Defence is the highest-ranking military officer on active duty in the Danish Armed Forces and has the rank of four-star General (or Admiral if from the Navy) (OF-9), and supervises roughly 93% of all military spending in Denmark.

The Danish Home Guard and Defence intelligence is directly under the Ministry of Defence, only in times of war will the Home Guard Command be transferred to the Defence Command, and thus come under the authority of the Chief of Defence.

The job was traditionally rotated evenly between the army, navy and air force. This tradition was abandoned in 2009. There is no fixed length of time associated with the position, the contract however currently has to be renewed every 5 years.

List of Chiefs of Defence

Timeline

Notes

References

Bibliography

 
 
 
 
 
 
 
 
 
 
 
 

Military of Denmark
Denmark
Chiefs of Staff (Denmark)